Milch is the German word for milk, and an old English word for a milk-producing cow. It is also the name of the following individuals:
Al Milch, American football coach
Ella Milch-Sheriff, Israeli composer
David Milch, American television writer and producer
Erhard Milch, German commander of the Luftwaffe during World War II
Klara Milch, Austrian swimmer and Olympic medallist
Werner Milch, German paratroop officer in World War II